Richmond–Brighouse is an elevated station on the Canada Line of Metro Vancouver's SkyTrain rapid transit system. Located in the Brighouse area of Richmond, British Columbia, Canada, it is one of the outbound terminus stations of the Canada Line, the other being YVR–Airport. Like YVR–Airport, Richmond–Brighouse only has a single track.

The station is located within Richmond's commercial centre, close to the Richmond Centre shopping mall and Richmond City Hall. The station is within a short walking distance of such amenities as Richmond Public Market, Richmond Hospital, and the Minoru civic complex, as well as other nearby offices, commercial, and residential buildings.

History
Richmond–Brighouse station was opened in 2009 along with the rest of the Canada Line and was designed by the architecture firm VIA Architecture. Construction of a new bus loop directly south of the station began in November 2019 and partially opened on October 19, 2020, for the 406 and 408 buses. The exchange was fully opened on November 9, 2020.

Station name
Richmond City Council proposed that the name "Brighouse" be used as the name of the station, since Brighouse is a historic name for the surrounding neighbourhood, thus reflecting the area's heritage. The area was named after an early settler, Samuel Brighouse, who was one of "The Three Greenhorns" of Vancouver. From 1920 until 1941, the area was the location of a horse-racing track known as Brighouse Racetrack.

Station information

Station layout

Entrances
Richmond–Brighouse station is served by a single entrance located at the south end of the stationhouse.

Transit connections

An on-street turn-around serves as the terminus for many bus routes that serve the area, and enables a convenient transfer to the Canada Line. This loop replaced the one previously at Richmond Centre.

A new bus exchange opened at the station on October 19, 2020, between No. 3 Road and Buswell Street. Two routes are currently assigned to use the exchange, while the rest will be assigned at a later date.

Bus bay assignments:

References

Canada Line stations
Railway stations in Canada opened in 2009
Buildings and structures in Richmond, British Columbia
2009 establishments in British Columbia